Frederick George Jackson (born February 20, 1981) is a former American football running back. He played college football at Coe College. After going undrafted in 2003 and playing three seasons in arena football and later NFL Europe, Jackson spent nine seasons with the Buffalo Bills, becoming their third all-time leading rusher. In the 2015 season, he was the oldest active running back in the NFL.

High school career 
Jackson attended Lamar High School in Arlington, Texas, where he played football and ran track. Although he was a member of the powerful Lamar Vikings teams of the late 1990s, he never started a game in his two years on the varsity team because he was considered too small (5 ft 8 in, 160 pounds) and too slow. He began his senior year as a third-string running back, and only after a knee injury to starter Justin Faust (headed to Stanford), was he elevated to second-string behind Tommicus Walker (headed to TCU).

Also a standout sprinter, Jackson was a state-qualifier in the 100 meters and recorded a time of 21.78 seconds as a member of the Lamar 4 × 100 m relay squad, breaking the previous record.

During his senior year, 14 of his teammates signed letters of intent to play college football, but he did not receive any offers. Instead, Wayne Phillips, his Nichols Junior High School football coach, arranged for him and his brother to enroll into Coe College, a Division III school that does not offer athletic scholarships.

College career 
At Coe College, Jackson was named to four All-American teams in 2002, rushing for 2,702 yards and 29 touchdowns. He was a two-time Iowa Intercollegiate Athletic Conference MVP for the Kohawks. He was also the MVP of the 2003 Stars Bowl. He graduated in 2003 with a degree in sociology.

Professional career

Sioux City Bandits 
After trying out for the Chicago Bears, Denver Broncos and Green Bay Packers, he went on to play indoor football for the Sioux City Bandits where he earned $200 a week, and an additional $50 for a win. Jackson played two seasons for the Bandits in the National Indoor Football League (2004) and United Indoor Football (2005). He was named the 2005 UIF co-MVP in 2005; in 18 games he ran for 1,770 yards and scored 53 touchdowns (40 rushing, 11 pass receiving and 2 on kick returns). During this time, he also worked as a youth counselor at Boys & Girls Home Family Services to make ends meet. His jersey number was retired by the Bandits in 2008.

While with the Bandits in 2004, Jackson's childhood home in Arlington, Texas, was torn down to make way for Cowboys Stadium, which replaced Texas Stadium as the home of the Dallas Cowboys in 2009. Jackson played in his former neighborhood on November 13, 2011, when the Bills faced the Cowboys.

Rhein Fire 
Jackson played in NFL Europa for the Rhein Fire in 2006, leading the team with 731 rushing yards.

Buffalo Bills 

Jackson was invited to training camp with the Buffalo Bills in 2006 by Bills general manager Marv Levy, a Coe College alumnus himself. He made his first career start against the Washington Redskins in 2007, rushing for 82 yards while catching four passes for 69 yards in a Bills victory. He became the first Division III running back to start an NFL game since December 24, 2000, when former Ferrum College running back Chris Warren started for the Philadelphia Eagles against the Cincinnati Bengals.

In a 2007 victory over the Miami Dolphins, Jackson rushed for 115 yards with a long of 27 yards to top the 100-yard rushing mark for the first time in his NFL career. Teammate Marshawn Lynch rushed for 107 yards, marking the first time the Buffalo Bills had two players rush for 100-plus yards in the same game since 1996 when Thurman Thomas and Darick Holmes accomplished the feat.

Before the 2009 season, Jackson signed a four-year contract extension to stay with the Bills.

At the end of the 2009 season, after winning the starting job from Lynch in Week 12, Jackson eclipsed the 1,000-yard rushing mark for the first time in his career with 1,062 yards and 2 touchdowns. He also set a career-high in catches with 46 for 371 yards and 2 more scores and also completed a 27-yard touchdown pass. Jackson also had 1,014 kickoff return yards making him the first player in NFL history to compile 1,000 rushing and 1,000 kickoff return yards. The 2,516 combined yards are the fifth highest all-purpose yards total in NFL history. In Week 17 of the 2009 season, versus the Indianapolis Colts, Jackson had a career day with 212 rushing yards and a receiving touchdown.

In 2011, Jackson was having his best season to date, as the team's undisputed starting running back. Jackson had six 100-yard rushing games in the first ten weeks. During a Week Eleven loss to Miami, however, Jackson suffered a fractured fibula. Jackson was placed on injured reserve later in the week, and missed the remainder of the season. At the time of his injury, Jackson's 934 yards were third in the NFL. The Bills had already been on a three-game losing streak when Jackson was injured, but lost all games but one for the rest of the 2011 season without Jackson. For his strong performance he was named to the USA Today All Joe Team as he was no longer Pro Bowl eligible.

On May 5, 2012, Jackson signed a two-year contract extension, keeping him with the Bills until 2015.

Jackson had arguably the best season of his career in 2013. Despite playing as the backup to C. J. Spiller most weeks, Jackson accumulated 1,283 yards from scrimmage and scored 10 total touchdowns. On October 19, 2014 Jackson suffered a groin injury against the Minnesota Vikings. He returned on November 9 against the Kansas City Chiefs.

On August 31, 2015, two days after he ran for 43 yards and a touchdown in a preseason win against the Pittsburgh Steelers, the Bills released Jackson as part of roster cuts. He finished third on the Bills' all-time rushing list.

Seattle Seahawks
On September 7, 2015, Jackson signed a one-year deal with the Seattle Seahawks, reuniting him with former Buffalo teammate Marshawn Lynch.

The Seahawks clinched a Wild Card berth in the playoffs, marking Jackson's first time participating in the postseason. On January 10, the Seahawks beat the Vikings 10-9 in the Wild Card round of the playoffs, giving Jackson his first career playoff win.

The Spring League
After spending the 2016 season out of football, Jackson announced an attempt at a comeback by signing with The Spring League, a league formed from the remains of the former Fall Experimental Football League, for its summer 2017 showcase.

Retirement
In April 2018, Jackson confirmed he was in talks with the Bills to sign a one-day contract and formally retire as a member of the team. The contract was signed, and Jackson subsequently retired, on April 18, 2018.

NFL career statistics

Accolades 
 During the 2009 season, Jackson became the first player in NFL history to compile 1,000 rushing and 1,000 kickoff return yards during one season.
 2010 winner of the Buffalo Bills/NFL Walter Payton "Man of the Year" award.
 During the 2010 season, Jackson was named to the USA Today All-Joe Team for his quality play.
 Number 83 Top 100 NFL Players (2012)
 NFL Ground Player of the Week (2010), Week 10)
 NFL Ground Player of the Week (2011, Week 2)

Outside of football

Personal life 
Jackson is married to Danielle Jackson, with whom he has four children. The couple have been married since 2006.

Car accident
On October 20, 2015, it was initially reported that a drag race just outside the Seahawks' training facility between Fred Jackson and teammate Marshawn Lynch ended with Jackson crashing his Corvette, first into a planter box and then a stop sign. However police later denied the report and said he was simply driving too fast.

Television 
Jackson had his own television program airing on WBBZ-TV. The Fred Jackson Show aired Mondays during football season. It debuted on September 10, 2012, and ran for Jackson's last three years in Buffalo. In 2018, Jackson signed with MSG Western New York to be an analyst for its weekly postgame series, Bills Tonight.

Jackson is now a part of Spectrum News One's post game show, Buffalo End Zone.

Steakhouse 
Along with fellow Bills alumni Brian Moorman and Terrence McGee and other prominent Buffalo figures, Jackson operates SEAR, a high-end steakhouse located within The Avant in downtown Buffalo.

FJ22 Sock for Charity 
In October 2018 Jackson teamed up with Codes Socks LLC to create a Signature Series Sock that will benefit a local charity called UB HEALS.

References

External links 
 Buffalo Bills bio

1981 births
African-American players of American football
American football running backs
Buffalo Bills players
Coe Kohawks football players
Living people
Lamar High School (Arlington, Texas) alumni
Players of American football from Fort Worth, Texas
Rhein Fire players
Seattle Seahawks players
Sioux City Bandits players
The Spring League players
21st-century African-American sportspeople
20th-century African-American people